Lake Grace is a loosely defined geographic area of Western Australia. Specific places include:
Lake Grace, Western Australia, a town
Shire of Lake Grace, a local government area
Lake Grace North, a lake
Lake Grace South, a lake
Lake Grace System, a wetland